The 2014–15 SC Bastia season was the 49th consecutive season of the club in the French professional leagues. The club competed in Ligue 1, the Coupe de la Ligue and the Coupe de France.

Bastia started the season with Claude Makélélé as manager, as a replacement for departing Frédéric Hantz, with Didier Tholot as an assistant coach. However, after suffering a new Ligue 1 defeat against Guingamp in November, Makelele was sacked and replaced by Ghislain Printant, former head coach of Bastia's youth academy.

Squad and statistics 

|-
! colspan="15" style="background:#dcdcdc; text-align:center"| Goalkeepers

|-
! colspan="15" style="background:#dcdcdc; text-align:center"| Defenders

|-
! colspan="15" style="background:#dcdcdc; text-align:center"| Midfielders

|-
! colspan="15" style="background:#dcdcdc; text-align:center"| Forwards

|-
! colspan="15" style="background:#dcdcdc; text-align:center"| Players who left during the season

|}

Friendlies

Competitions

Ligue 1

League table

Results summary

Results by round

Matches

Coupe de la Ligue

Coupe de France

References 

SC Bastia seasons
Bastia